Propustularia surinamensis is a species of sea snail, a cowry, a marine gastropod mollusk in the family Cypraeidae, the cowries.

Distribution
This species was found in the Lake Tanganyika, East Central Africa.

Description 
The maximum recorded shell length is 48 mm.

Habitat 
Minimum recorded depth is 7 m. Maximum recorded depth is 780 m.

References

 Crosse, H. 1878. Descriptions d'espèces nouvelles de mollusques. Journal de Conchyliologie 26:166-169, pl. 3.
 Fischer-Piette, E., 1950. - Liste des types décrits dans le Journal de Conchyliologie et conservés dans la collection de ce journal (avec planches)(suite). Journal de Conchyliologie 90: 149-180
 Rosenberg, G.; Moretzsohn, F.; García, E. F. (2009). Gastropoda (Mollusca) of the Gulf of Mexico, Pp. 579–699 in: Felder, D.L. and D.K. Camp (eds.), Gulf of Mexico–Origins, Waters, and Biota. Texas A&M Press, College Station, Texas.
 Meyer C. 2003. Molecular systematics of cowries (Gastropoda: Cypraeidae) and diversification patterns in the tropics. Biological Journal of the Linnean Society, 79: 401-459.
 Burgess C.M. (1985). Cowries of the world. Cape Town: Gordon Verhoef, Seacomber Publications. xiv + 289 pp
 Lorenz F. & Hubert A. (2000) A guide to worldwide cowries. Edition 2. Hackenheim: Conchbooks. 584 pp.

External links
 Perry, G. (1811). Conchology, or the natural history of shells: containing a new arrangement of the genera and species, illustrated by coloured engravings executed from the natural specimens, and including the latest discoveries. 4 pp., 61 plates. London
 Coomans, H. E. (1963). Systematics and distribution of Siphocypraea mus and Propustularia surinamensis (Gastropoda: Cypraeidae). Studies on the Fauna of Curaçao and other Caribbean Islands: no. 68. 15(1): 51-71.

Cypraeidae
Gastropods described in 1811